Park Jung-chul (born Park Chul on November 5, 1976) is a South Korean actor. Park made his acting debut in 1997 through a talent search by the KBS network, and has since starred in the romantic comedy film Oh! Happy Day (2003) and television dramas such as Legend (2001), Present (2002), Remember (2002), Blue Fish (2007), Eight Days, Assassination Attempts against King Jeongjo (2007), War of Money: The Original (2008), My Lady (2008), Wife Returns (2009), Gwanggaeto, The Great Conqueror (2011), and Angel's Revenge (2014). He has also been a cast member of the reality show Law of the Jungle since 2012.

Personal life 
Park married his girlfriend of six years, a flight attendant, on April 12, 2014 at the Grand InterContinental Seoul Parnas.

Filmography

Television series

Film

Variety show

Awards and nominations

References

External links
  
 
 
 

1976 births
Living people
South Korean male television actors
South Korean male film actors
Male actors from Seoul
Chung-Ang University alumni